Anima is a tabletop role-playing franchise developed by Anima Game Studio. Anima's fantasy setting called Gaïa. is significantly inspired by Japanese role-playing video games such as Final Fantasy, 
Dragon Quest and Suikoden, and features manga-like art, Eastern concepts of honor codes, mysticism and martial arts. Additionally, the world of Anima combines those elements with traditional Western fantasy ones, such as medieval arms.

Tabletop games

Anima: Beyond Fantasy

The tabletop role-playing game that started the franchise was originally published by Edge Entertainment in 2005, which is located in Spain.

Translations
A French translation was published in France in 2007 by UbIK, a French company that merged in 2008 with Edge Entertainment, Anima's Spanish editor. An English translation of Anima was released in October 2008 by the American company Fantasy Flight Games (FFG) and is still included in FFG's games catalog. A German translation is planned.

Although the English translation was originally slated for an August 2006 release, multiple release dates came and went without the game being released. The publisher's website told of a September 2008 release. Gen-Con Indy saw the initial release, followed by a full release in October 2008.

The translation is not a second edition of the game but rather a revised version. For a while, it was believed that an electronic version of an English translation of the first edition existed. According to an email by Jeremy Stomberg of Fantasy Flight Games:

"There is no official translation of the Anima: Beyond Fantasy RPG in PDF. The only official English translation is in the computers at FFG. By the time the FFG translation was ready, Edge (the Spanish publisher) already had the 2nd Edition finished, so we decided to release the 2nd Edition so gamers would have the most up-to-date book. We expect it out this summer."

As of June 28, 2010, Fantasy Flight Games has published the core rules in PDF format on DriveThruRPG.
The publishing was discontinued May 26, 2016.

Supplements
Released in English
 Anima: Beyond Fantasy (August 2008, PDF format June 2010)
 Game Master's Toolkit (August 2009)
 Gaïa Volume 1: Beyond the Dreams! (June 2010)
 Dominus Exxet: Dominion of Ki (July 2011)
 Those Who Walked Among Us (16 September 2011)
 Arcana Exxet: Secrets of the Supernatural (25 July 2012)
 Prometheum Exxet (17 June 2013)
 Character Folder
 Character Diary (Male)
 Character Diary (Female)
 Core Exxet: (Second edition basic rules)
 Gaïa Volume 2: Beyond the Mirror

Anima: Tactics
Anima: Tactics is a 32mm miniature game set in the Anima universe, produced and distributed by the U.S. company Cipher Studios. The game is played with individual characters and advantage cards that are worth a certain number of points.

Miniatures
All Anima: Tactics characters have a side (Light, Dark, or Neutral) and a faction.

Limited Edition Miniatures
Anima: Tactics is not a collectable game, but some characters are given a limited-edition variant pose in addition to their standard re-printable pose. Cipher studios has so far released two Limited Edition variants: Celia and Khaine-D'Lacreu. The Limited-Edition Celia since selling out has become highly collectable and has in the past fetch prices as high as US$100 on online auctions.

International Competition
Every year since 2008 there has been a US National Championship held at Gen Con Indianapolis. Since 2007 annual European and German Championships take place at Dreieich Con near Frankfurt, Germany.

As of 2015, the European Championships take place in Bonn, Germany. 

Current European ranking:

Anima: The Card Game
The card games are non-collectable, and are meant to be played with three to four (five with expansion) people. They may be played with two people, although the gameplay is less dynamic. The original English edition of Shadow of Omega was re-released with errata and a new card material to match future releases.

Expansions
 Shadow of Omega
 Shadow of Omega Revised
 Beyond Good and Evil
 The Twilight of the Gods

Video games

Anima: Ark of Sinners

Anima: Ark of Sinners is a platform video game developed and published by Anima Game Studio exclusively for Wii.

Reception

Anima: Ark of Sinners received "unfavorable" reviews, according to review aggregator Metacritic.

Anima: Gate of Memories

Anima: Gate of Memories is an action role-playing video game developed by Anima Project and published by Badland Games for Linux, Microsoft Windows, OS X, PlayStation 4, Xbox One, and Nintendo Switch in 2016. The game received "mixed" reviews, according to review aggregator Metacritic.

Factions

List of factions within the game.

Sacred Holy Empire of Abel
The ruling faction of Gaïa for seven centuries, Abel's supremacy toppled with the death of the former Emperor and rise of Elisabetta Barbados. They seek the Lost Loggia and rally their forces to regain their former prestige.

Azur Alliance
Formerly allied with the Empire, Azur is now their chief rival in seeking the Lost Loggia.

The Church
The Church seeks out supernatural forces that endanger the world.

Samael
The Samael are the remnants of the world's supernatural creatures rallied by the Fallen Angels.

Wissenschaft
A clandestine organization founded and controlled by prince Lucanor. Agents are implanted with technology infused with magic.

Black Sun
A corporation that seeks out artifacts. After acquiring the Book of the Dead, Black Sun entered the arms race by raising the undead.

Tol Rauko
Templars of the island Tol Rauko who preserve Gaïa's ancient civilizations.

Sisters of Selene
An all-female band of assassins led by Alaxa Ul Del Serendis.

The Lost Ones
A small band of survivors of "The End of Fairy Tales" when the kingdom of Sylvania fell who follow the Emperor's son Nerelas Ul Del Sylvanus in his search for the ancient artifact The Eye of God in order to wipe out the human race.

Wanderers
A term for those without an affiliation.

References

External links
 Anima: Beyond Fantasy Website
 Anima Tactics Wiki
 Forums
 Anima Tactics - International ranking
 Anima Tactics Championships

Fantasy role-playing games
Spanish role-playing games